The 2000 United States presidential election in Nebraska took place on November 7, 2000, and was part of the 2000 United States presidential election. Voters chose five representatives, or electors to the Electoral College, who voted for president and vice president.

Nebraska was won by Governor George W. Bush by a 29% margin of victory, winning every county. Also, with 62.25% of the popular vote, the state proved to be his fourth strongest state in the 2000 election after Wyoming, Idaho and Utah. As of the 2020 presidential election, this is the last time the Democratic ticket did not win a single county in Nebraska.

Results

Results by county

Counties that flipped from Democratic to Republican
Dakota (Largest city: South Sioux City)
Saline (Largest city: Crete)
Thurston (Largest city: Pender)

By Congressional district
Bush won all three congressional districts.

Electors

The electors of each state and the District of Columbia met on December 18, 2000 to cast their votes for president and vice president. The Electoral College itself never meets as one body. Instead the electors from each state and the District of Columbia met in their respective capitols.

The following were the members of the Electoral College from the state. All were pledged to and voted for George Bush and Dick Cheney:
Mary Johnson
Lee Terry, Sr.
Howard Lamb
Mildred Curtis
John Y. McCollister

See also
 United States presidential elections in Nebraska
 Presidency of George W. Bush

References

Nebraska
2000
Presidential